Manson is an unincorporated community and census-designated place in Chelan County in the U.S. state of Washington. It was named in 1912 for Manson F. Backus, president of the Lake Chelan Land Company.

Manson is part of the Wenatchee–East Wenatchee Metropolitan Statistical Area.

The USPS ZIP code for Manson is 98831. As of the 2020 census, the population in the Manson was 1,523. 2010 was the first year that Manson was tracked by the census bureau.

Manson is home to a number of notable wineries; Tildeo, Cairdeas, Succession, Lake Chelan Winery, Chelan Ridge and Amos Rome

References

External links
Manson Chamber of Commerce
Lake Chelan Chamber of Commerce
Manson Village Tribune, online newspaper
Video tour of Manson - Tour town, waterfront, and wineries.

Census-designated places in Washington (state)
Census-designated places in Chelan County, Washington
Wenatchee–East Wenatchee metropolitan area